Broken Spell is a 1958 Iranian drama film directed by Siamak Yasemi. It was entered into the 9th Berlin International Film Festival.

Cast
 Naser Malek Motiei
 Nostratollah Mohtashem
 Taghi Zohouri

References

External links

1958 films
1958 drama films
Iranian drama films
1950s Persian-language films
Films directed by Siamak Yasemi